Cross country running is a sport in which teams and individuals run a race on open-air courses over natural terrain such as dirt or grass. It is both an individual and a team sport; runners are judged on individual times and teams by a points-scoring method. Both men and women of all ages compete in cross country, which usually takes place during autumn and winter, and can include weather conditions of rain, sleet, snow or hail, and a wide range of temperatures.

Cross country running is one of the disciplines under the umbrella sport of athletics and is a natural-terrain version of long-distance track and road running. Although open-air running competitions are prehistoric, the rules and traditions of cross country racing emerged in Britain. The English championship became the first national competition in 1876, and the International Cross Country Championships was held for the first time in 1903. Since 1973, the foremost elite competition has been the World Athletics Cross Country Championships.

Race course

Course design
While a course may include natural or artificial obstacles, cross country courses support continuous running, and do not require climbing over high barriers, through deep ditches, or fighting through the underbrush, as do military-style assault courses.

A course at least  full allows competitors to pass others during the race. Clear markings keep competitors from making wrong turns, and spectators from interfering with the competition. Markings may include tape or ribbon on both sides of the course, chalk or paint on the ground, or cones. Some classes use colored flags to indicate directions: red flags for left turns, yellow flags for right turns, and blue flags to continue straight or stay within ten feet of the flag. Courses also commonly include distance markings, usually at each kilometer or each mile.

The course should have  of level terrain before the first turn, to reduce contact and congestion at the start. However, many courses at smaller competitions have their first turn after a much shorter distance. The course should also have a corral or chute after the finish line to facilitate the recording of finishing positions.

Distances
Courses for international competitions consist of a loop between 1750 and 2000 meters. Athletes complete three to six loops, depending on the race. Senior men and women compete on a 10 kilometre course. Junior men compete on an 8-kilometre course and junior women compete on a 6-kilometre course.

Strategy
Because of differences between courses in running surface, frequency and tightness of turns, and amount of up and downhill, cross country strategy does not necessarily simplify to running a steady pace from start to finish. Coaches and cross country runners debate the relative merits of fast starts to get clear of the field, versus steady pacing to maximize physiological efficiency. Some teams emphasize running in a group in order to provide encouragement to others on the team, while others hold that every individual should run his or her own race. In addition, whether you run ahead 'of the pack' or behind it and pull ahead in the end is important, but can vary according to the runner's individual skill, endurance, and the length of the race. Runners should also account for food intake prior to the race. Most important, however, is the training beforehand.

Equipment
Cross country running involves very little specialized equipment. Most races are run in shorts and vests or singlets, usually in club or school colours. In particularly cold conditions, long-sleeved shirts and tights can be worn to retain warmth without losing mobility. The most common footwear are cross country spikes, lightweight racing shoes with a rubber sole and five or more metal spikes screwed into the forefoot part of the sole. If a course has a harder surface, spikes as short as  may be most effective. While spikes are suitable for grassy, muddy, or other slippery conditions, runners may choose to wear racing flats, rubber-soled racing shoes without spikes, if the course includes significant portions of paved surfaces or dirt road.

History

Formal cross country competition traces its history to the 19th century and an English game called "hare and hounds" or "the paper chase". English schools started competing in cross country races in 1837, and established a national championship on 7 December 1867. It was held on Wimbledon Common in south-west London. It was the first cross country race that was considered "open", or could be run by anyone. Its original purpose was to imitate steeplechase for off-season training, and was considered a bit of a joke. The race was about 3.5 miles long, and went through very boggy and hilly terrain. The course was not well marked, and many competitors got lost, resulting in it being declared a no-race. Matters were not helped by the fact that the race was run in the dark, as it began at 5 pm.

Olympic Games

Cross country was contested as a team and individual event at the 1912, 1920 and 1924 Summer Olympics. Sweden took gold in 1912, and Finland, led by Paavo Nurmi, captured the gold in 1920 and 1924. During the 1924 race in the Paris heat wave, only 15 of the 38 competitors reached the finish. Eight of those were taken away on stretchers. One athlete began to run in tight circles after reaching the stadium and later knocked himself unconscious, while another fainted 50 meters from the finish. José Andía and Edvin Wide were reported dead, and medics spent hours trying to find all the competitors who had blacked out along the course. Although the reports of deaths were unfounded, spectators were shocked by the attrition rate and Olympic officials decided to ban cross country running from future Games. Since 1928, cross country has been contested only as the fifth discipline of the modern pentathlon, and until 2016 it was the only discipline where the Olympic competition was only part of the modern pentathlon.

World championships
Beginning in 1973, the IAAF began hosting the renamed World Cross Country Championships each year. In 1975, the New Zealand men and United States women won, marking the first championships by non-European countries. In 1981 an African nation (Ethiopia) won the men's race for the first time, and a decade later an African nation (Kenya) won the women's race for the first time. Ethiopia or Kenya has captured every men's title since 1981 and every women's title since 2001. Through 2010, Kenya has won 40 World Cross Country Championships and Ethiopia has won 23.

Notable athletes
 Kenenisa Bekele won both short and long World Cross Country course titles in the same year five times (2002–2006), after a junior men victory and senior long course silver in 2001. The IAAF calls him the "greatest ever male cross country runner to have graced the sport."
 Edward Cheserek is the three-time individual winner of the NCAA Division I championship in 2013, 2014, and 2015. Cheserek is the only athlete to win three straight individual NCAA championships.

Regional organizations
Beyond championships, IAAF world cross country meetings include the Great Edinburgh International Cross Country, Cross Internacional de Itálica, Antrim International Cross Country, Cinque Mulini, Nairobi Cross, Chiba International Cross Country, Fukuoka International Cross Country meet, Eurocross and Almond Blossom Cross Country.

Australia
Cross country running is organized at the state level by the athletics association for each state. In Queensland this Queensland Athletics. In the Masters category (over 30), this is organized by Australian Masters Athletics. Brisbane will host the Australian Masters Nationals Championships, 21–24 April 2011 with the Cross Country hosted by Thompson Estate and Eastern Suburbs Athletics.

The cross country season in Brisbane is usually March – September. During the season there is usually one race each week in a different park, generally organized and hosted by one of the participating clubs. Photos of such events can be found here.

Canada
Cross country running is a far-reaching sport in Canada. In middle school, races are more serious and are divided by grade and gender. In high school, the races are far-reaching and tend to be the main talent pool (especially at the senior level) for university- or national-level runners. At the university level, the sport is administered by Canadian Interuniversity Sport.

India
National Championship is held every year by Athletics Federation of India. Nagaland hosted 56th National cross country Championship. It was held along with South Asian Cross country championship which was held by South Asian Athletics Federation. Last edition edition was held in Indira Gandhi Stadium, Kohima. Himalayan Adventure Challange is another extreme cross country race held in Himalayan mountain slopes.

United Kingdom
Primary schools, although more often the juniors, also participate in cross country events and some areas of England have done so since the late 1960s. An example would be schools near Ouston, County Durham which compete as part of Chester-le-Street & District Primary Cross Country Association.

United States

USA Track & Field (USATF) hosts four annual national cross country championships. The USA Cross Country Championships, first held in 1890, include six races: masters women (8 km), masters men (8 km), junior women (6 km), junior men (8 km), open women (8 km) and open men (12 km). In addition to crowning national champions, the championships serve as the trials race to select the Team USA squad for the IAAF World Cross Country Championships. The USATF Masters 5 km Cross Country Championships, first held in 2002, incl men's race and a women's race. The USATF National Club Cross Country Championships, first held in 1998, feature the top clubs from across the United States as they vie for honors and bragging rights as the nation's top cross country team. The USATF National Junior Olympic Cross Country Championships, first held in 2001, has raced for boys and girls in five different two-year age divisions.

Most American universities and colleges field men's and women's cross country teams as part of their athletic program. Over 900 men's cross country teams and over 1000 women's cross country teams compete in the three divisions of the National Collegiate Athletic Association.

Every state offers cross country as a high school sport for boys and girls. Over 440,000 high school students compete in cross country each year, making it the sixth-most popular sport for girls, and seventh most popular for boys.

Mt. San Antonio College (Mt. SAC) in Walnut, California, hosts the largest cross country invitational in the United States, with over 22,000 runners from community colleges, high schools and elementary schools competing. The meet started in 1948 and continues today.

Notable races 

 World Cross Country Championships is an international cross country championship race hosted by World Athletics (formerly the IAAF) in which athletes represent their home countries. Since 2011, the race has been held every two years. World Athletics describes the race as "the most grueling, ‘back to basics’ event of the World Athletics Series."
 NCAA Division I Cross Country Championships are races held for men and women by the NCAA every fall as the culminating events of the inter-collegiate cross country season. Runners represent their schools and can qualify either as a team or as an individual. The NCAA describes the Division I races as "one of the most intriguing of all DI championships."
 USATF National Club Cross Country Championships is an annual cross country competition hosted by USA Track and Field usually held in mid-February. There are five races within this championship: a masters women 6 km, masters men 60+ 8 km, masters men (40-59) 10 km, open women 6 km, and open men 10 km. The open races serve as selection competitions for the world cross country championships.
 Great Edinburgh International Cross Country is a cross country competition held annually in Edinburgh, Scotland. The competition consists of four races: the junior men’s 6km, the junior women’s 4km, senior men’s 8km and senior women’s 6km. While the event frequently attracts world-class competition, it has not been held since 2019.

Notable Courses 

 Franklin Park is a park in Boston, Massachusetts. Franklin Park, described as a "famed cross country course," hosted the IAAF World Cross Country Championships in 1992. The course hosts high school races, college, and professional races, including the New England Cross Country Championships. It is also home the annual Battle in Beantown collegiate invitational.
 Van Cortlandt Park is located in the Bronx, NY and has been described as "the most storied cross country course in the United States." The park has hosted NCAA cross championships, world cross country championships, and is used for training by many elite runners in the area. It is also home to the annual Manhattan College Cross Country Invitational.
 Lavern Gibson dubbed "Cross Country Town USA," this course is located in Terre Haute, Indiana and is the home course of Indiana State University. It has hosted the NCAA Division I Cross Country championships 12 times. The course is notable because it was designed specifically for cross country races.
 Thomas Zimmer Championship Course is located on the campus of the University of Wisconsin. The course opened in the fall of 2009, and was host to the 2018 NCAA Cross Country Championship. The course is also home to the annual Nuttycomb Wisconsin Invitational, one of the largest collegiate cross country competitions.

Eating disorders 
Physical leanness is desirable to achieve competitive success in cross country running. This emphasis on body weight has led to a culture of eating disorders within the sport. Scholars have cited a high incidence of eating disorders among cross country (long-distance) runners. They have noted that while eating disorders can occur in all runners, they are far more prevalent among female athletes. Other factors, such as social pressures and the overall stress of the college environment also contribute to the prevalence of eating disorders among female college cross country runners. Following professional runner Mary Cain's 2019 account of how the competitive pressures of long distance running contributed to her eating disorder, many other prominent female cross country athletes have tried to bring attention to the issue of eating disorders in the sport.

See also

References

Further reading

 Havitz, Mark E., and Eric D. Zemper, "'Worked Out in Infinite Detail': Michigan State College's Lauren P. Brown and the Origins of the NCAA Cross Country Championships," Michigan Historical Review (Spring 2013), 39#1, pp. 1–39.

 
athletic sports
athletics by type
discontinued Summer Olympic disciplines in athletics
long-distance running
running by type
sports originating in the United Kingdom
team sports